Polanowice may refer to the following villages in Poland:
 Polanowice, Lesser Poland Voivodeship (south Poland)
 Polanowice, Lubusz Voivodeship (west Poland)
 Polanowice, Opole Voivodeship (south-west Poland)
  (central Poland)